Filiz Besim is a Turkish Cypriot politician, dentist and writer. She became a member of Council of Ministers as the Minister of Health for Northern Cyprus in 2018.

Education
Besim completed her secondary studies at the Türk Maarif Koleji. She later graduated from the Ankara University's Faculty of Dentistry in 1987. She received her PhD from the same university in 2000.

Political career
Besim was asked to be the Minister of Health in 2015 by the leader of Republican Turkish Party at the time and former President Mehmet Ali Talat. However she refused the offer citing internal problems within the party.

She became a candidate of Republican Turkish Party for the 2018 parliamentary election after receiving an invitation from Tufan Erhürman, the leader of the party. She failed to obtain a seat as a Member of Parliament for Morphou. She was appointed to be the Minister of Health and received her new post on 2 February 2018.

References

External links

Ministry of Health

1965 births
Living people
People from Paphos
Republican Turkish Party politicians
Government ministers of Northern Cyprus
Türk Maarif Koleji alumni
Turkish Cypriot women in politics
Ankara University alumni
Turkish Cypriot expatriates in Turkey